Berycidae is a small family of deep-sea fishes, related to the squirrelfishes. The family includes the alfonsinos and the nannygais.

Distinguishing features include spiny scales and large eyes and mouths.

References

 
Ray-finned fish families
Taxa named by Richard Thomas Lowe